John McVay (1931–2022) was an American football coach and executive.

John McVay may also refer to:
John McVay (producer) (born 1960), British film and television producer

See also
John McVeigh (disambiguation)
John McVey (born 1959), American singer-songwriter